Yelena Rabaya nee Shishirina (born 3 April 1960) is a Russian former sport shooter who won several medals at senior level at the World Championships and European Championships. She also competed in the women's double trap event at the 1996 Summer Olympics.

See also
 Trap World Champions
 Double trap World Champions
 Trap and double trap European Champions

References

External links
 

1960 births
Living people
Trap and double trap shooters
Russian female sport shooters
Soviet female sport shooters
Olympic shooters of Russia
Shooters at the 1996 Summer Olympics
Sportspeople from Tula, Russia